Jan Erola (born 20 November 1969) ) is a Finnish communications entrepreneur and former journalist and publisher. He is the part-time Head of Public Affairs of the Finnish Startup Community, and is also the CEO of his own Kravat Oy, a communications consultancy company. Kravat has designed and published a professional networking tool software application HookedOn. Erola formerly worked as an associate director for Kreab, a multinational communications agency, for both the London and Helsinki offices.
For several years, Erola was involved with the Sport and Healthtech startup event SMASH, e.g. by hosting the SMASH LONDON event in 2018.

Career 
Jan was born 20 November 1969 at London, He was worked as publishing and communications manager for Paasilinna Publishing  and as a CEO and publisher for Helsinki Books Ltd. He was the program director of the Helsinki Book Fair 2017–2017.

He also worked as the communications and marketing manager of Yellow Film & TV Ltd. From 2004 to 2009, Erola was the publishing manager of Ajatus Kirjat, a non-fiction imprint of Gummerus Publishers. Erola was a staff writer for Ylioppilaslehti, Iltalehti, Helsingin Sanomat and Talouselämä. He was the editor-in-chief of Ylioppilaslehti (1998-2000).

He is a columnist for Suomen Kuvalehti and has written columns for ET-lehti, Yleisradio's Radiomafia, Avotakka, Markkinointi & Mainonta, Metro (Finland edition), Valitut Palat, Me Naiset, Journalisti, and Helsingin Sanomat Sport pages. His blog, Kustantajan Kulma, focuseds on publishing.

Erola worked as a radio journalist, and created content for Yleisradio Radio 1 and other Finnish TV shows. Hes has been a regular news commentator on the weekly YLE TV1 Morning program Jälkiviisaat (AKA In Hindsight) since 2000, appearing in hundreds of broadcasts.

Personal life 

Jan Erola has a Master of Social Sciences degree in recent/political history from Helsinki University. 
Born in London, Erola has also lived in Oxford with his then wife Anne Moilanen and family.
He sings and co-writes songs in a parody band, Punatähdet ("the Red Stars"), under the artist name of "Aatos Punanen.". Punatähdet sings mainly in Finnish, but has performed e.g. in Canada, in Sointula BC. Erola British vintage car enthusiast. He own an old Mini and a Jaguar.

Erola is a member of the advisory board of the Finnish National Theatre and the Board of the Finnish Society of Sport Sciences.

References

External links
 Political parody band Punatähdet ("the Red Stars")
 Helsinki Bookfair
 Kreab

1969 births
Journalists from London
Finnish journalists
Living people
Finnish expatriates in the United Kingdom